Southern Thailand, Southern Siam or Tambralinga is a southernmost cultural region of Thailand, separated from Central Thailand region by the Kra Isthmus.

Geography

The western part has highly steep coasts, while on the east side river plains dominate. Smaller rivers include the Pattani, Saiburi, Krabi, and the Trang. The biggest lake of the south is Songkhla Lake ( altogether). The largest artificial lake is the Chiao Lan (Ratchaprapha Dam), occupying  of Khao Sok National Park in Surat Thani.

Running through the middle of the peninsula are several mountain chains, with the highest elevation at Khao Luang, in Nakhon Si Thammarat Province. Ranging from the Kra Isthmus to Phuket Island is the Phuket chain, which connects to the Tanao Si Mountain Range further north. Almost parallel to the Phuket chain, but  to the east is the Nakhon Si Thammarat or Banthat chain, which begins with Samui Island, Ko Pha Ngan, and Ko Tao in Surat Thani Province and ends at the Malaysian border at the Ko Ta Ru Tao archipelago. The border with Malaysia is formed by the Sankalakhiri range, sometimes sub-divided into the Pattani, Taluban, and Songkhla chain. At the Malaysian border the Titiwangsa chain rises up.

The limestone of the west coast has been eroded into many steep singular hills. The parts submerged by the rising sea after the last ice age now form many islands, like the well-known Phi Phi Islands. Also well known is the so-called  James Bond Island in Phang Nga Bay, featured in the movie The Man with the Golden Gun.

The population of the growing region is projected to be 9,156,000 in 2015, up from 8,871,003 in 2010 (census count and adjusted), despite these figures are adjusted for citizens who have left for Bangkok or who have moved to the region from elsewhere, as well as registered permanent residents (residency was problematic in the prior 2000 census), the figure is still misleading. There are still a huge number of migrant or informal workers, temporary workers, and even stateless people, and a large expatriate population which is not included.

Most of Southern Thailand is in Tenasserim-South Thailand semi-evergreen rain forests ecoregion. The Peninsular Malaysian rain forests and Peninsular Malaysian montane rain forests ecoregions extend into southernmost Thailand along the border with Malaysia.

History

The Malay peninsula has been settled since prehistoric times. Archeological remains were found in several caves, some used for dwellings, others as burial sites. The oldest remains were found in Lang Rongrien Cave, dating 38,000 to 27,000 years before present, and in the contemporary Moh Khiew cave.

In the first millennium Chinese chronicles mention several coastal cities or city-states. No exact geographical locations were recorded, so the identification of these cities with later settlements is difficult. The most important of these states were Langkasuka, usually considered a precursor of the Patani Kingdom; Tambralinga, probably the precursor of the Nakhon Si Thammarat Kingdom, or P'an-p'an in Phunphin district, Surat Thani, probably located at the Bandon Bay Tapi River. The cities were highly influenced by Indian culture, and have adopted Brahman or Buddhist religion. When Srivijaya in Chaiya extended its sphere of influence, those cities became tributary states of Srivijaya. The city Chaiya in Surat Thani Province contains several ruins from Srivijaya times, and was probably a regional capital of the kingdom. Some Thai historians even claim that it was the capital of the kingdom itself for some time, but this is disputed.

After Srivijaya lost its influence, Nakhon Si Thammarat became the dominant kingdom of the area. During the rule of King Ramkhamhaeng the Great of Sukhothai, Thai influence first reached Nakhon Si Thammarat. According to the Ramkhamhaeng inscription, Nakhon Si THammarat was a tributary state of Sukhothai. During most of later periods, Nakhon became a tributary of Ayutthaya.

The deep south belonged to the Malay sultanates of Pattani and Kedah, while the northernmost part of the peninsula was under the control of Bangkok.

During the Thesaphiban reforms at the end of the 19th century, both Nakhon Si Thammarat and Pattani were incorporated into the central state. The area was subdivided into 5 monthon, which were installed to control the city states (mueang). Minor mueang were merged into larger ones, thus forming the present 14 provinces. With the Anglo-Siamese Treaty of 1909 the boundary to Malaysia was fixed. Kedah came under British control, while Pattani stayed with Siam.

Languages
The largest native language is Southern Thai, also known as Pak Thai or Dambro, which is a southwestern Tai language spoken in the 14 changwat of southern Thailand as well as by small Thai communities in the northernmost Malaysian states. It is spoken natively by roughly five million people and as a second language by the 1.5 million native speakers of Patani Malay, along with other ethnic groups such as the local Negritos communities, and other tribal groups.

Although Central Thai is the sole official language in Thailand and most people are able to communicate in Central Thai, the language is only the third largest native language in Southern Thailand, with roughly four hundred thousand native speakers. In particular, it is only native among Teochew, Hoklo, Hakka and Cantonese ethnic groups, particularly in their major ethnic enclaves like Hat Yai and Bandon districts.

Administrative divisions

The Office of the National Economic and Social Development Council (NESDC) identities Southern Thailand as 14 provinces.
The Thai Meteorological Department (TMD) includes for Southern Thailand (east coast) also the two provinces: Prachuap Khiri Khan and Phetchaburi.

Demography

Ten major cities of southern Thailand

Religion

Thailand is a Buddhist majority country. About 93.46% in Thailand follow Buddhism. Buddhism is the majority religion in Southern Thailand as well. However, Buddhism makes up only 75.45% in Southern Thailand. Thai people follow Theravada Buddhism. Minority ethnic groups such as Khmer also follow Buddhism. 10 out of 14 provinces in Southern Thailand have Buddhist majorities. 

Islam constitutes 24.33% of Southern Thailand even though Islam only constitutes 5.36% of the whole country. Islam is mostly followed by Malay people in Southernmost Thailand. There's also a small Thai Muslim population. Islam is the majority religion in the Malay majority in Yala, Pattani, Naratiwat and Satun provinces near Malaysia known as Southernmost Thailand. 

Christianity makes up 0.21% of Southern Thailand population.
Sikhism makes up 0.05% in Southern Thailand. Sikhism is followed by Indian immigrants.

Economy
The bulk of the southern population relies on agriculture for 27 percent of its gross regional product in 2014. It is followed by industry (12 percent), trade (10 percent), transportation (9 percent), tourism (8 percent), and construction and property (7 percent).
For FY 2018, Southern Thailand Region had a combined economic output of 1,402 trillion baht (US$45.2 billion), or 8.6 percent of Thailand's GDP. Surat Thani province had an economic output of 206.869 billion baht (US$6.67 billion). This equates to a GPP per capita of 182,371 baht (US$5,883), more than double for Yala province, which is fifth and more than three times for Narathiwat province, lowest in the ranking.

Kamphaeng Phet province had an economic output of 117.705 billion baht (US$3.8 billion). This amounts to a GPP per capita of 150,783 baht (US$4,864), half more than for Tak province, which is fifth in the ranking.

Transportation
Southern Thailand is connected with Bangkok by railway as well as highway. Several regional airports are located at the larger towns. The transportation hub of all south Thailand is Hat Yai.

Road
Phetkasem Road is the longest road in Thailand, running from Bangkok along the Kra Isthmus and then along the west coast of the peninsula. From Trang it crosses over to the east coast to Hat Yai, and ends at the Malaysian border.

Two Asian highways run through Southern Thailand: Asian Highway 2 runs mostly parallel to the railroad all the way from Bangkok. It crosses to Malaysia at Sadao, and continues on the west side of the peninsula. Asian Highway 18 begins in Hat Yai and runs south along the east coast, crossing to Malaysia at Sungai Kolok.

Rail
The southern railway connects Bangkok to Hat Yai, and continues from there to Sungai Kolok. There are branches from Ban Thung Phoe Junction to Kirirat Nikhom. Two smaller branches of the railway run from Thung Song to Trang and Nakhon Si Thammarat, and from Hat Yai Junction to Malaysia and Singapore.

Air
Southern Thailand has five international airports and six domestic airports.  Thailand's transport ministry is constructing the 1.9 billion baht Betong Airport. It is scheduled for completion in 2020.

 Chumphon Airport
 Hat Yai International Airport
 Krabi International Airport 
 Nakhon Si Thammarat Airport
 Narathiwat Airport
 Pattani Airport
 Phuket International Airport 
 Ranong Airport
 Ko Samui International Airport 
 Surat Thani International Airport 
 Trang Airport

See also
 South Thailand insurgency
 Yawi language
 OK Betong — Thai film set in Southern Thailand.

References

Further reading
Suthiwong Pongpaiboon. Southern Thai Cultural Structures and Dynamics Vis-à-vis Development. .

External links

 
.
Regions of Thailand